Absard is a city in Tehran Province, Iran.

Ab-e Sard or Ab-i-Sard or Absard may also refer to:
 Absard, Fars
 Ab-e Sard, Kohgiluyeh and Boyer-Ahmad
 Ab-e Sard, Lorestan